Jeffrey Mark Holy, Sr. (born October 25, 1955)  is an American politician, lawyer, and police officer currently serving as a member of the Washington State Senate for the 6th legislative district. A Republican, he previously served as a member of the Washington House of Representatives. Prior to entering politics, Holy was a police officer with the Spokane Police Department.

Personal life 
Holy's wife is Cindy Holy. They have two children.

See also 
 Kent Pullen

References

External links 
 Jeff Holt at ballotpedia.org

1955 births
Living people
Republican Party members of the Washington House of Representatives
21st-century American politicians
American municipal police officers
Republican Party Washington (state) state senators